Gordisa is a village in Baranya county, Hungary, located near the Croatian border.

External links 
 Street map 

Populated places in Baranya County